Brocks Gap Dam was a never-built proposal for a water storage dam on the North Fork of the Shenandoah River at Brocks Gap in northwest Virginia. The proposal by the U.S. Army Corps of Engineers encountered opposition from local residents and was withdrawn in 1967.

Potomac River Basin system
Brocks Gap Dam was first proposed in the 1920s by the U.S. Army Corps of Engineers on the North Fork of the Shenandoah River, at a cost in 1921 dollars of $1,889,895. The proposal was revived and updated after World War II and advanced in the late 1950s. The dam was to be part of a series of dams proposed by the Corps' Potomac River Basin Report, which envisioned an ambitious series of water storage and flood control dams throughout the Potomac River basin, responding to a perception of need for additional water and a threat of flooding. Brocks Gap is a water gap in Little North Mountain in Rockingham County, Virginia, just upstream from Cootes Store.

Description
The proposal was slightly revised during the 1940s and 1950s.

Construction was planned to start in 1969 and be complete by 1973, at a projected cost of $16,437,000. The reservoir was intended to provide water to the towns of Broadway and Timberville, to lower the temperature of the North Fork and to provide reserve water storage capacity for the Potomac River basin, as well as recreation. The reservoir was expected to inundate 17 commercial buildings, 68 farms, 47 houses, a school and two churches, primarily in the small community of Fulks Run.

Normal flow would be regulated by an  outlet tunnel in the north abutment, with an unregulated spillway at the south abutment for floods.

Opposition
The dam proposal encountered intense local opposition from residents of the area to be flooded. As early as 1945 the project was condemned by Virginia Senator Harry F. Byrd, who objected to property condemnations and public expenditure. By the 1960s community groups had organized a campaign against the dam. Although the project was supported by the National Park Service, the plan was withdrawn in 1967, in favor of small dams on headwater streams, funded by the Soil Conservation Service.

References

United States Army Corps of Engineers proposed dams
Rockingham County, Virginia
Shenandoah River